The 2023 ANZ Premiership season will be the seventh season of Netball New Zealand's ANZ Premiership.

Transfers

Team list

Notes

  Hannah Glen signed with the Mainland Tactix but in September 2022 during the Netball New Zealand Open Championship suffered a knee injury (ACL) and will miss the 2023 Season. Vika Koloto had orignal signed as a Training Partner but was elevated from Training Partner to the contracted 10. Taiana Day has joined the side as a Training Partner in the place of Vika Koloto
  Kayla Johnson (netball) signed with the Northern Stars but on the 24th of January 2023 announced that she is pregnant with baby no. 2 due in July 2023 and will most likely miss the 2023 season, Training Partner Lisa Putt will be replacing her.
  Shannon Saunders (netball) signed with the Southern Steel but on the 23rd of August 2022 announced that she is pregnant with her first baby and will miss the 2023 season. Ivari Christie will be replacing Shannon in the contracted 10
  Sarahpheinna Woulf signed with the Southern Steel but annouced that she is pregnant with her first baby and will miss the 2023 seasonl Courtney Elliot will be replace Sarahpheinna in the contracted 10.
  George Fisher signed with the Southern Steel but in February 2023 during a preseason match against the NSW Swifts suffered a serious knee injury (ACL and associated fracture) and will miss the 2023 season. Eseta Autagavaia will be replacing George in the contracted 10
  Oceane Maihi signed with the Waikato Bay of Plenty Magic but in October of 2022 Oceane suffered a knee injury (ACL) and will miss the 2023 Season. Amy Christopher has been elevated into the contracted 10.

Regular season

Round 1

Round 2

Round 3

Round 4

Round 5

Round 6

Round 7

Round 8

Round 9

Round 10

Round 11

Round 12

References

2023
2023 in New Zealand netball